HKB may refer to:

 Haken-Kelso-Bunz model, a theoretical model of motor coordination
 Halenadu Karnataka Brahmins, a Kannada speaking Smartha Brahmin community
 Haus der Kultur und Bildung, a building in Neubrandenburg, Germany
 Healy Lake Airport, in Alaska, United States
 Hoysala Karnataka Brahmins, a Kannada speaking Smartha Brahmin community
 Homi K. Bhabha, an Indian critical theorist